Neobarya is a genus of fungi in the family Clavicipitaceae.

Species
Neobarya agaricicola
Neobarya aurantiaca
Neobarya byssicola
Neobarya ciliaris
Neobarya danica
Neobarya darwiniana
Neobarya lichenophila
Neobarya lutea
Neobarya parasitica
Neobarya peltigerae
Neobarya usneae
Neobarya xylariicola

References

Sordariomycetes genera
Clavicipitaceae